The Western Australian of the Year Awards (previously the WA Citizen Of The Year Awards) are annually awarded to seven individuals who have made an outstanding and enduring contribution to the advancement of the state and people of Western Australia through their chosen field of endeavour. An overall winner is chosen from the recipients of each category award.

The awards have been given every year since 1973. The awards were originally known as the WA Citizen Of The Year Awards, and included categories for organisations as well as individuals. The awards were renamed in 2012, when Foundation Day was renamed to Western Australia Day.

Worthy individuals and organisations may be nominated by fellow West Australians and cannot nominate themselves.

The categories that make up this annual award are: Aboriginal, Arts and Culture, Business, Community, Professions, Sport, Youth. Also at other times, the Epic Achievement Award, Spirit of WA, Lifetime achievement award, Special Year 2000 award, and the Sir Charles Court inspiring leadership awards have been awarded.

Award recipients may choose to use the post-nominal CitWa after their name.

Past recipients include: Tim Winton, St John Ambulance, Sir Charles Court, Fiona Wood, The Health Department of W.A, ericaamerica designer Lucas Bowers, Wally Foreman, Mili Davies and Joan Winch.

References

Further reading
 Wainwright, Janet.(1984) Citizen of the Year - is the concept working? The West Australian, 23 June 1984, p. 17,

Society in Western Australia
Western Australia